The Communist Party of Kazakhstan (Qazaqstan Kommunistık Partiasy, QKP) is a banned political party in Kazakhstan.

Origin 
The Communist Party of Kazakhstan was founded 1936, when Kazakhstan was granted a Union Republic status within the Soviet Union. The Communist Party of Kazakhstan had been a branch of Communist Party of the Soviet Union (CPSU) until the dissolution of the Soviet Union.

Post-Soviet restructuring 

The 18th Congress of the Communist Party of Kazakhstan took a decision to rename the Communist Party as the Socialist Party and split from CPSU. Nursultan Nazarbayev, the party chairman, resigned when he became the first President of Kazakhstan in 1991. Dissatisfied members of the old Communist Party recreated the Communist Party of Kazakhstan in October 1991 at the 19th Congress of the party. The QKP was officially registered on 27 August 1998. The Communist Party of Kazakhstan has a well-established party structure with offices in all of the oblasts. The QKP was estimated to have around 70 thousand members. QKP largely appeals to above-middle age segment of the population especially in Urban areas who have a strong nostalgia for Soviet times.  The leader of QKP was Serikbolsyn Abdildin, a respected, old generation politician in Kazakhstan.

In the mid-1990s, the QKP participated in opposition coalition movements "Azamat" and "Pokolenie" ("Generation"). In 1996, CPK initiated unregistered "National-Patriotic Movement-Republic". In February 1998, it joined the opposition bloc "People’s Front of Kazakhstan".

The party became split on 13 April 2004, when a group led by Vladislav Kosarev started accusing party First Secretary Serıkbolsyn Äbdıldin of accepting money from questionable sources. The splinter party, the Communist People's Party of Kazakhstan, initially failed to meet 50,000 membership requirement to be officially registered but is now represented in the legislature.

At the last legislative elections, 19 September and 3 October 2004, an alliance of the Communist Party of Kazakhstan and the Democratic Choice of Kazakhstan won 3.4% of the popular vote and no seats. At 4 December 2005 presidential elections, Communist Party of Kazakhstan, Democratic Choice of Kazakhstan and the Naghyz Ak Zhol formed a coalition movement For a Just Kazakhstan and supported Zharmakhan Tuyakbay as presidential candidate.

Party activities were suspended in 2012 by a regional court because of alleged cooperation with the banned party Alga! which has links to fugitive politician Mukhtar Ablyazov.

The party was banned in 2015 by the Almaty city court because the number of party members was below the legal number of 40,000. The sentence was denounced as politically motivated by the party leaders, and was condemned by the Communist Party of Greece (KKE), the Russian Communist Workers' Party (RKRP) and the Communist Party in Turkey (KP). The KKE delegation in the European Parliament denounced the ban to the High Representative of the Union for Foreign Affairs and Security Policy Federica Mogherini, asking her opinion about the ban of the party and the restrictions to political activities in Kazakhstan.

However, the legality of the sentence was defended by the Communist People's Party of Kazakhstan (QKHP), whose leadership accused the QHP of ignorance of  the law. Despite having previously protested against the ban on the Communist Party of Ukraine (KPU), the Communist Party of the Russian Federation (KPRF) released no official statement on the matter.

First Secretaries 
 Leonid Korolkov (1992 – October 1994)
 Baidabek Tolepbayev (October 1994 – April 1996)
 Serikbolsyn Abdildin (April 1996 – 17 April 2010)
 Gaziz Aldamzharov (17 April 2010 – 4 September 2015)

See also 
 Alma-Ata Regional Committee of the Communist Party of Kazakhstan

References

External links 

Political parties in Kazakhstan
Communist parties in Kazakhstan
Banned communist parties
Banned political parties in Kazakhstan
Political parties established in 1997
International Meeting of Communist and Workers Parties
Neo-Sovietism